Filip Johansson (born 23 March 2000) is a Swedish professional ice hockey defenceman for Frölunda HC of the Swedish Hockey League (SHL) on loan as a prospect to the Vancouver Canucks of the National Hockey League (NHL).

Playing career
Johansson made his professional debut with Leksands IF in the HockeyAllsvenskan, after developing through their junior ranks, in the 2017–18 season. 

On 23 June 2018, Johansson was selected by the Minnesota Wild in the first round, 24th overall, of the 2018 NHL Entry Draft.

On 25 March 2020, Johansson left Leksands IF after five seasons within the organization by agreeing to a two-year contract with Frölunda HC.

With the Wild opting not to sign Johansson before his drafts rights expired, he was later signed as a free agent to a two-year, entry-level contract with the Vancouver Canucks on 13 June 2022. He would continue his tenure with Frölunda HC on loan from the Canucks for the 2022–23 season.

Career statistics

Regular season and playoffs

International

References

External links
 

2000 births
Living people
Frölunda HC players
Leksands IF players
Minnesota Wild draft picks
National Hockey League first-round draft picks
Sportspeople from Västerås
Swedish ice hockey defencemen